The 1997 Uxbridge by-election was a parliamentary by-election held in July 1997 to elect a new Member of Parliament (MP) for the constituency of Uxbridge in Greater London, England. The seat was held by the Conservative Party, their first such victory since 1989.

Background
The vacancy was caused by the death of the Conservative MP Michael Shersby, who died unexpectedly on 8 May 1997, just seven days after his being returned to the House of Commons at the 1997 general election. Although that election saw the end of 18 years of Conservative rule as Labour won by a landslide, Shersby won a narrow victory over Labour Party candidate David Williams.

The by-election was called for Thursday, 31 July 1997 and was the first by-election of the 1997-2001 parliament.

Candidates
David Williams, the Labour general election candidate was not placed on the by-election shortlist, which the BBC reported had "infuriated" some members. Activist Michael Shrimpton was also passed over, leading to his defection to the Conservatives. The Labour Party eventually chose Andy Slaughter, the Leader of Hammersmith and Fulham Council, over the Barrister Willie Bach from Nottinghamshire. The Conservative Party selected John Randall, the Managing Director of the century-old Randall's Furniture Store in Uxbridge. Keith Kerr, a senior executive with British Airways, represented the Liberal Democrats. Eight other candidates also stood, including perennial candidates Screaming Lord Sutch and Ronnie Carroll.

Campaign
Labour's concentrated campaign included an unusual visit by Prime Minister Tony Blair. This was unusual in that a sitting Prime Minister does not normally campaign personally in by-elections for fear that a defeat may harm his own political standing. Conservative leader William Hague was the first leader of his party to campaign in a by-election for 20 years. The Conservative campaign was criticised by some members for keeping records of how much time would-be future parliamentary candidates had spent in the constituency.

Results and aftermath
In the end, the Conservative candidate was elected by a large majority, gaining over 50% of all votes cast, while the Labour and Liberal Democrat votes both fell. It was the first time the Conservatives held onto a seat at a by-election since the 1989 Richmond by-election (when the candidate was William Hague - who had become leader of the party shortly before the Uxbridge by-election).

Randall represented the seat (and its successor, Uxbridge and South Ruislip) until standing down in 2015. Slaughter entered parliament eight years later, winning the seat of Ealing, Acton and Shepherds Bush in 2005. He has represented the Hammersmith constituency since 2010.

See also
List of United Kingdom by-elections

References

External links
Campaign literature from the by-election British Parliamentary By-Elections (Archived)

Uxbridge by-election
Uxbridge,1997
Uxbridge,1997
Uxbridge by-election
Uxbridge by-election
Uxbridge